The Oloy is a river in Magadan Oblast in Russia, a right tributary of the Omolon (Kolyma's basin). The river flows through sparsely populated areas of Chukotka.

Course
It has its sources in the Ush-Urekchen range, at the confluence of Left Oloy and Right Oloy. 
It flows roughly northwestwards between the Ush-Urekchen to the south and the Oloy Range to the north.

See also
List of rivers of Russia

References

External links
 Pictures of Chukchi people in the Oloy basin
  

Rivers of Magadan Oblast
Rivers of Chukotka Autonomous Okrug